Enteractinococcus helveticum is a Gram-positive bacterium from the genus Enteractinococcus which has been isolated from industrial wastewater.

References

Bacteria described in 2016
Micrococcaceae